{{Infobox award
| name           = Annie Award for Best Animated Television Commercial
| awarded_for    = Excellence in animated television commercials
| presenter      = ASIFA-Hollywood
| country        = United States
| year           = 1992
| year2          =
| holder         = ''"Save Ralph" – Arch Model Studio (2022)
| website        = 
}}
The Annie Award for Best Animated Television Commercial is an Annie Award given annually to the best animated television commercials. The category was first presented at the 20th Annie Awards.

Winners and nominees
1990s
 Best Animated Television Commercial Best Animated Promotional Production Outstanding Achievement in an Animated Interstitial, Promotional Production or Title Sequence Outstanding Achievement in an Animated Television Commercial2000s

2010s

2020s
 Best Sponsored'''

References

External links 
 Annie Awards: Legacy

Annie Awards